Silvia Costa (born June 12, 1949) is an Italian journalist and politician who served as a Member of the European Parliament from 2009 until 2019.

Early life and career
Costa was born in Florence and received a degree in modern literature from the Sapienza University of Rome. She worked as a journalist for newspapers, magazines and television (RAI). Costa was editor of the daily Il Popolo from 1978 to 1985.

Political career
Costa was a councillor for the city of Rome from 1976 to 1985.

Costa sat in the Italian Chamber of Deputies as a member of the Christian Democracy party from 1983 to 1994. From 1995 to 2005, she was a member of the National Council for Economics and Labour.

Costa was elected to the European Parliament in 2009 for the Democratic Party and was reelected in 2014. During her time in parliament, she was a member of the Committee on Culture and Education and served as its chair from 2014 to 2017. She served as vice-chair of the  Delegation for relations with Iraq from 2009 to 2014. She was a member of the Committee on Women's Rights and Gender Equality from 2009 to 2012.

References 

1949 births
Living people
Italian women journalists
Sapienza University of Rome alumni
Deputies of Legislature IX of Italy
Deputies of Legislature X of Italy
Deputies of Legislature XI of Italy
Christian Democracy (Italy) members of the Chamber of Deputies (Italy)
MEPs for Italy 2009–2014
MEPs for Italy 2014–2019
Democratic Party (Italy) politicians